Oxford Pro Musica Singers (OPMS) is a chamber choir based in Oxford, England.

Founded by Michael Smedley in 1977 as the Oxford Pro Musica Chorus to accompany the Oxford Pro Musica Orchestra, the choir soon took on a life of its own and performed regularly in Oxford as well as three of London's main concert halls: St John's, Smith Square, the Queen Elizabeth Hall and the Purcell Room. The choir reached the final of BBC/Sainsbury's Choir of the Year competition and won a Bronze Medal in the Llangollen International Eisteddfod, whilst as representatives of the United Kingdom abroad they achieved a Silver Medal in the international 'Florilege Vocal de Tours' competition in France. A recent visit to Europe was a trip to southern Spain in 2012. They have also made several recordings, ranging from folk songs to jazz classics, garnering a rosette from the Penguin CD Guide for their disc of Tavener, Pärt, and Henryk Górecki. Michael Smedley led the choir for a 25th anniversary concert University Church of St Mary the Virgin, High Street, Oxford, in 2002.

Since the end of 2013, the choir has been directed by Mark Jordan. They perform a wide range of music, from 16th-century polyphony to modern works by composers such as Morten Lauridsen, Ola Gjeilo, and Will Todd, but are also at home with the pillars of the choral repertoire: performances of Rachmaninoff’s All-Night Vigil and Bach’s B Minor Mass in the Sheldonian Theatre in Oxford, with the period orchestra Instruments of Time and Truth, were part of the choir's 2015 season.

References

External links
 OPMS website

1977 establishments in England
Musical groups established in 1977
Oxford choirs
University choirs
Chamber choirs